Xeresa is a municipality in the comarca of Safor in the Valencian Community, Spain. It is located 55 kilometers at the south of Valencia and 110 kilometers north from Alicante and can be accessed through road N-332. Xeresa is an essentially agricultural village.

References

Municipalities in the Province of Valencia
Safor